A golf trolley or golf push cart is a cart designed for transporting a golf bag, complete with clubs and other golf equipment around the golf course. The manual push cart (or less commonly a pull cart) can reduce strain on the operator compared to carrying the golf bag by itself when transporting the golf equipment.

Electric golf trolleys 

An electric golf trolley is an electric golf trolley (a battery-powered cart). It eliminates the need for golfers to carry or push their own clubs or hiring a caddie, and can require much less effort to push around than a manual push or pull trolley.

The first use of an electric golf trolley was on a golf course was by JK Wadley of Texarkana, Texas/Arkansas, who saw a three-wheeled electric cart being used in Los Angeles to transport senior citizens to the grocery store. Electric golf trolleys were introduced into the United Kingdom by Joe Catford, who established the company Powakaddy in 1983. Having sold Powakaddy in the early 1990s, Catford went on to found HillBilly, another company specializing in electric golf trolleys.

See also 

 Golf cart (also called a golf car)
 Trolley (disambiguation)

Golf equipment
Electric vehicles